Nadine Denize (born 6 November 1943) is a French mezzo-soprano.

Career 
She won a First prize and was hired by the Paris opera. She made her debut as Cassandra in Berlioz's Les Troyens and Marguerite in La Damnation de Faust.

She was also a Wagnerian singer.

Discography 
 Mors et vita by Charles Gounod with the orchestre du Capitole de Toulouse directed by Michel Plasson
 Pelléas et Mélisande by Claude Debussy with the Berlin Philharmonic directed by Herbert von Karajan 1978 EMI
 Guercoeur by Alberic Magnard with the orchestre du Capitole de Toulouse directed by Michel Plasson 1987 EMI

See also 
 Debussy: Pelléas et Mélisande (Herbert von Karajan recording)

References

External links 
 Personal website
 
 Nadine Denize on Discogs
 Nadine Denize on France Musique
 Biography of Nadine Denise
 Nadine Denize as Cassandra, in Les Troyens-1978 on YouTube
 Interview with Nadine Denize October, 1982

Musicians from Rouen
1943 births
Living people
French operatic mezzo-sopranos
Chevaliers of the Légion d'honneur